Rodolfo R. Lana Jr. (born October 10, 1972), known professionally as Jun Robles Lana, is a Filipino filmmaker. The winner of 11 Palanca Awards for Literature, he became the youngest member of the Palanca Hall of Fame in 2006.
In 2015, he directed the actual one-shot film, Shadow Behind The Moon, which won the Best Director, NETPAC and FIPRESCI awards at the 13th Pacific Meridian Film Festival. At the 20th International Film Festival of Kerala, he won the Best Director award for the same film.

Writing career
He was born Rodolfo Lana Jr. in Makati, and attended local schools.

Interested in writing from an early age, he began to write and submit plays in Filipino language to competitions. He has adopted Jun Lana as his pen name. At age 19, he received an "Honorable Mention" citation in the 1991 Palanca Awards in the category Dulang May Isang Yugto (One-Act Play in Filipino), for his play Eksodo. The following year, Lana won Third Prize in the same category for Churchill.

In the next eight years, Lana won nine more Palanca Awards for his Filipino-language screenplays and teleplays, including First Prizes for the screenplays Karinyo-Brutal (1995) and Mga Bangka sa Tag-araw (1996); and for the teleplays Sa Daigdig ng mga Taksil (1995), and together with Peter Ong Lim, for Pula (1997).

In 2006, Lana's teleplay Milagrosa won his fifth First Prize Palanca Award and his 11th overall. With his fifth First Prize, Lana was inducted into the Palanca Hall of Fame.

Film and television work

Since 1998, Lana has written screenplays for such directors as Marilou Diaz-Abaya Mel Chionglo and Maryo J. de los Reyes. His screenplay for Diaz-Abaya's Sa Pusod ng Dagat (1998) won Lana the Best Screenplay award from the Brussels European Film Festival|Brussels International Film Festival in 1998.

He has won two FAMAS Best Screenplay awards — in 1998 for Jose Rizal (shared with Ricky Lee and Peter Ong Lim) and in 1999 for Soltera (shared with Jerry Lopez Sineneng). His screenplay for Jose Rizal also won awards from the Metro Manila Film Festival and the Star Awards for Movies. In 2005, Lana's Palanca-award-winning play Mga Estranghero at ang Gabi (1994) was adapted for film by Rody Vera. Renamed Pusang Gala and directed by Ellen Ongkeko-Marfil, the film was nominated for several FAMAS awards, including a Best Story nomination for Lana.

Lana made his film directorial debut with Gigil (2006), starring Katrina Halili. The following year, he wrote and directed Roxanne. Since 2006, Lana has been employed by GMA Television Network, where he functions as a creative consultant for the drama department, and as head writer of Magpakailanman and other shows.  Lana also directs for television, sometimes in collaboration with actor Cesar Montano. For GMA Network, he directed his Palanca Award-winning teleplay Milagroso, which was aired as a television special and became a finalist at the 2006 Asian TV Awards. Lana has also directed television episodes for  Love2Love, Wag Kukurap, and Fantastikids.

His 2012 film Bwakaw was selected as the Filipino entry for the Best Foreign Language Oscar at the 85th Academy Awards, but it did not make the final shortlist.

In 2014, Lana and frequent filmmaking partner, Perci Intalan, established The IdeaFirst Company, a company for creative content creation and consultancy. The company has produced many films of which has been awarded in numerous screenings in the Philippines and overseas.

In the 29th Tokyo International Film Festival, his 2016 film Die Beautiful won the festival's Audience Choice Award, and also the Best Actor award for Paolo Ballesteros.

2019 he won the Best Director Award for his feature film Kalel, 15 at the Tallinn Black Nights Film Festival. The film had its world premiere in the Estonian capital where it was screened in the official selection.

Personal life 
Lana is gay and married Perci Intalan, a former TV5 executive, in a same-sex wedding ceremony in New York City on October 14, 2013. Lana and Intalan were in an open relationship until their separation in December 2021. They consider themselves as best friends and co-parents to their content creation and artist management company, IdeaFirst. Lana is the vice president of the IdeaFirst.

Credits

Films
Sa Pusod ng Dagat (1998; writer)
Sagad sa Init (1998; writer)
Jose Rizal (1998; writer)
Saranggola (1999; writer)
Soltera (1999; writer)
Sa Paraiso ni Efren (1999; writer)
Muro Ami (1999; writer)
Mapagbigay (2000; writer)
Red Diaries(2001; writer)
Bagong Buwan (2001; writer)
I Think I'm in Love (2002; writer)
Bedtime Stories (2002; writer)
Two Timer (2002; writer)
Pusong Gala (2005; story)
Gigil (2006; director)
Roxxxanne (2008; writer, director)
My Neighbor's Wife (2011; writer, director)
Yesterday, Today, Tomorrow (2011; director)
Bwakaw (2012; writer, director)Barber's Tales / Mga Kwentong Barbero (2013; writer, director)So It's You (2014; writer, director)The Prenup (2015; director)Haunted Mansion (2015; director)Bakit Lahat ng Gwapo may Boyfriend? (2016; director)Die Beautiful (2016; director)Ang Dalawang Mrs. Reyes (2018; director)Ang Babaeng Allergic sa Wifi (2018; director)The Panti Sisters (2019: director)Unforgettable (2019; director) Especially For Your Love (2020; director)The Super Praybeyt Benjamin (2020; director)Ten Little Mistresses'' (2023: director, producer)

Awards

References

External links

1972 births
Filipino dramatists and playwrights
Living people
Filipino television directors
Filipino screenwriters
Palanca Award recipients
People from Makati
Writers from Metro Manila
Filipino LGBT screenwriters
Gay dramatists and playwrights
LGBT film producers
Gay screenwriters
GMA Network (company) people